Albert Fenner Kercheval (March 16, 1829 in Preble County, Ohio – January 24, 1893) was a fruit grower and poet in Los Angeles County, California, and a member of the Los Angeles Common Council during the 19th Century.

Biography
Kercheval was born on 16 March 1829 in Preble County, Ohio; the family moved to Joliet in Will County, Illinois shortly after his birth. Kercheval, who was referred to as a "Will County boy" by one newspaper,
crossed the continent with a group of American pioneers from Peoria, Illinois, leaving from St. Joseph, Missouri, on April 20, 1849. He settled in Los Angeles by 1870.<ref name=CSU-Pomona>{{Cite web |url=http://www.csupomona.edu/~reshaffer/Books/LettersToThePeople/agrix.htm |title=Ralph E. Shaffer, Letters From the People: Los Angeles Times, 1881–1889 |archive-url=https://archive.today/20121212021658/http://www.csupomona.edu/~reshaffer/Books/LettersToThePeople/agrix.htm |archive-date=2012-12-12 |url-status=dead}}</ref>

His wife, Sarah Adelaide Wilson Kercheval, died in the family residence on Lemon Street on April 13, 1892. They had three children, Rosalie Wilson Kercheval, Leland Nelson Kercheval and Venia Alice Kercheval.

Kercheval was a miner in the Mother Lode and in Arizona. He later became one of the leading horticulturalists in the Los Angeles area. He sold his orchard at Santa Fe and Ninth streets for subdividing in 1887.

Kercheval's poetry was published in the Los Angeles Times 
 and was read at meetings of local organizations. His 532-page book, Dolores and Other Poems,'' was published in 1883 by A. L. Bancroft & Company of San Francisco. The book included poems by his daughter Rosalie.

Public service

Kercheval was elected on December 3, 1877, to represent the 3rd Ward on the Los Angeles Common Council, the governing body of the city, for a one-year term, ending December 6, 1878.

In 1890, he was a member of the Los Angeles County Agricultural Commission and served as its president. Historian Ralph E. Shaffer wrote that: "To some growers he would come to represent a bureaucratic establishment that did not know what to do about the problem facing the industry yet dictated unreasonable solutions to which the growers must conform."

References

Farmers from California
Poets from California
Writers from Los Angeles
1829 births
1893 deaths
American miners
Los Angeles Common Council (1850–1889) members
19th-century American politicians
People from Will County, Illinois
Poets from Illinois
19th-century American poets
American male poets
19th-century American male writers